This is a partial list of wooden covered bridges in the U.S. state of Maine.

Bridges

Extant

Former

See also

List of bridges on the National Register of Historic Places in Maine
World Guide to Covered Bridges

References

External links

National Society for the Preservation of Covered Bridges
Maine Tourism article about the state's covered bridges

 
Maine
covered bridges
Bridges, covered